Dorothy Greenhough-Smith (27 September 1882 – 9 May 1965) was a British figure skater.

She was born Dorothy Vernon Muddock in Stokesley, North Riding of Yorkshire, the daughter of writer James Edward Preston Muddock, and married publisher/editor Herbert Greenhough Smith in 1900.

Greenhough-Smith won the bronze medal at the 1908 Summer Olympics, the first Olympics where figure skating was contested. She was the 1912 World silver medalist, which was the first silver medal in ladies skating for Great Britain (Madge Syers having won the silver in men's singles). She never competed at the European Figure Skating Championships because the ladies event was not added to the program until 1930.

Away from the ice, she also played tennis; she entered the 1914 Wimbledon Championships, losing in the first round.

Competitive highlights

References

External links
 Skatabase
 Database Olympics
 
 http://skateguard1.blogspot.com/2018/02/sweet-doll-of-haddon-hall-dorothy.html

Figure skaters at the 1908 Summer Olympics
Olympic figure skaters of Great Britain
British female single skaters
Olympic bronze medallists for Great Britain
1882 births
1965 deaths
Olympic medalists in figure skating
World Figure Skating Championships medalists
British female tennis players
Medalists at the 1908 Summer Olympics
Place of birth missing